"Streets of Love" is a song by rock band the Rolling Stones which was released as a double A-side single with "Rough Justice" from the 2005 album A Bigger Bang. The single was released on 22 August 2005, prior to the album.

Overview
"Streets of Love", a power ballad with a spare, guitar-based arrangement and falsetto chorus, received the main marketing push, though it failed to become a major hit in the US. By contrast, it went to number one in Spain, the top 10 in Argentina, Belgium, Denmark, Finland, the Netherlands, and Sweden, and the top 20 in Germany, Greece, Italy, and Norway. It was also a top 20 hit in the UK (where it was released as a double A-side with "Rough Justice"), reaching number 15 in the UK Singles Chart, some 42 years after their first UK hit "Come On".

"Streets of Love" is one of the few Rolling Stones songs licensed for use in advertising (See "Start Me Up", "You Can't Always Get What You Want", "She's a Rainbow"). It is heard in a television commercial for mobile telephony provider Vodafone Italy, in which the company's spokes-model Megan Gale also appears. The video for this song was shot at Zaphod Beeblebrox, a nightclub in Ottawa, Ontario and Canadian actor Tan Arcade was cast and featured in the video. It was debuted live on 11 July 2006 in San Siro, Milan, Italy.

Track listing
 CD and 7-inch single
 "Streets of Love" – 5:10
 "Rough Justice" – 3:11

Personnel
 Vocals and electric rhythm guitar: Mick Jagger
 Acoustic guitar: Keith Richards
 Electric lead guitar: Ron Wood
 Drums: Charlie Watts
 Bass: Darryl Jones
 Pianos and organs: Chuck Leavell and Matt Clifford
 Strings and programming: Matt Clifford

Charts

References

The Rolling Stones songs
2005 singles
Music videos directed by Jake Nava
Songs written by Jagger–Richards
Song recordings produced by Don Was
Rock ballads
Song recordings produced by Jagger–Richards
2005 songs
Number-one singles in Spain